Korphai Ensemble, Korphai or  kor phai which literally means a 'bunch of bamboo', is an ensemble of traditional Thai percussion  music.

It was established in the 1980s by Anant Narkkong, the present musical director of the ensemble, who is a professor of ethnomusicology and composition at the Faculty of Music at Silpakorn University. He also airs a radio program of Thai music at the National Broadcasting Services of Thailand.

Music
The group plays Thai classical, or piphat, as well as Thai contemporary music. Throughout the past 20 years, Korphai has released a number of albums and performed in numerous public concerts in Thailand, including a performance with the Bangkok Symphony Orchestra. The group has also performed abroad, including Los Angeles, San Francisco, Chicago, Paris, Amsterdam and Berlin.

The groups is also involved in the music used in Thai films, documentaries, theatres, plays, and festival presentations, such as "Thai Percussion Days 2004" in Vienna. Their music was used in the Thai films, The Legend of Suriyothai (2001) and The Overture (2004). The Overture won Best Music with Kor Phai named as co-recipient in Star Entertainment Awards 2004 and Bangkok Critics Assembly Awards.

In 2005, at the concert dedicated to the 55th anniversary of Thai-Cambodian diplomatic relations at the Chaktomuk Theatre, the performance of the ensemble "won accolades from members of Cambodian royal family", Bangkok Post reported.

Discography 
2007 - Korphai : Bamboo Songs Bamboo Sounds
2004 - Original Motion Picture Soundtrack: The Overture
2003 - Homrak Hom Rong (The Delightful Overture) (Label: Nong Taprachan)
 Ratree Pradap Dao

Awards

Korphai Music Genres 

1. Traditional Thai Music: Piphat, Mahoree, Kruangsai
Ancient repertoire and selected compositions from famous Thai composers.

2. Folk-Pop music
Variety of songs; ranging from Thai folks to international popular music.

3. Fusion Jazz music
Variety of Thai songs rearranged in fusion style.

4. Asian-mix
Musics of Southeast Asian; rearranged in flexible performance style including stage movements.

5. Experimental music
Improvisations & Compositions from modern Thai composers plus multi-media presentations.

6. Theatre Music / Film Music

Korphai musicians

References

External links
Korphai profile at the Cultural Projects Factory
"Korphai Colourful Thai Percussion"
Electroacoustic piece at the Mahidol University library. Commission by Patravadi Theatre, Live Premiere at Konzerthaus Wien, Austria in 2004 by Korphai Ensemble

Thai musical groups